Rachel Leigh Hilbert (born March 14, 1995) is an American fashion model. She is best known for being a spokesmodel for Victoria's Secret's lingerie and apparel line, PINK as well as walking Victoria's Secret Fashion Show from 2015 to 2017.

Early life
Hilbert grew up in Webster, New York, a suburb of Rochester. Hilbert modeled locally in her youth, until her mother brought her to New York City during spring break of her second year in high school to audition for various modeling agencies. Hilbert was a competitive high school skier and dancer at Webster Thomas High School, where she graduated in 2013.

Career
In 2015, she starred in one episode of the TV series Younger, where she played a minor character alongside Nico Tortorella, Hilary Duff and Sutton Foster. Earlier the same year, she had hosted a Spring Break event for PINK with Gigi Hadid and Cody Simpson. She was also featured in Brett Eldredge's music video for the song "Lose My Mind", in which she played a nurse. In 2018 Hilbert suffered from major injuries a broken foot, followed by two broken arms at the same time, and a tendon transfer, resulting in her having to take a break from modeling. In 2019 Hilbert was one of the lead roles in the movie "Three days Rising". In 2019 Hilbert was in multiple fashion campaigns. In 2020 Hilbert was featured in multiple fashion magazines and filmed the movie "The Retaliators" coming out in 2021, in 2021 Hilbert also shot for Playboy magazine, L official, Hamptons Magazine.

In 2014, she became the official spokesmodel for Victoria's Secret's lingerie and apparel line, PINK, and walked in the annual Victoria's Secret Fashion Show from 2015 to 2017.

Rachel fronted campaigns for Urban Outfitters, Delia's, Macy's, Free People, Juicy Couture, Kohl's. She has also been featured in international editions of many magazines, such as Cosmopolitan, Elle, Harper Bazar, L official, Hamptons magazine, Playboy magazine, Maxim magazine, Marie Claire. She appeared on multiple magazine covers.

Filmography

References

External links

1995 births
Female models from New York (state)
Living people
21st-century American women